Paphos District is one of the six districts of Cyprus and it is situated in the western part of Cyprus. Its main town and capital is Paphos. The entire district is controlled by the internationally recognized government of Cyprus. There are four municipalities in Paphos District: Paphos, Yeroskipou, Peyia, and Polis Chrysochous.

The area of the district is 1,396 km2, which constitutes the 15.1% of the total area of the island, and the population in 2011 was 90,295. Its coastal area is characterized by gulfs and coves, capes and points, beaches and tiny isles. The district can be divided into three morphological regions: the coastal plain, lying mainly below 200 metres, the hilly area extending from plain up to the igneous rocks of Paphos forest and the mountainous region, lying mainly on the igneous rocks of the Paphos forest. North-west of the District is the Akamas peninsula which contains a national park where the green sea turtle is a protected animal.

Settlements
According to Statistical Codes of Municipalities, Communities and Quarters of Cyprus per the Statistical Service of Cyprus (2015), Paphos District has 4 municipalities and 121 communities. Municipalities are written with bold.

 Acheleia
 Agia Marinouda
 Agia Varvara
 Agios Dimitrianos
 Agios Georgios
 Agios Ioannis
 Agios Isidoros
 Agios Nikolaos
 Akoursos
 Amargeti
 Anadiou
 Anarita
 Androlykou
 Argaka
 Arminou
 Armou
 Asprogia
 Axylou
 Ayia Marina Chrysochous
 Ayia Marina Kelokedharon
 Chloraka
 Choletria
 Choli
 Choulou
 Chrysochou
 Dhrousha
 Drymou
 Eledio
 Empa
 Episkopi
 Evretou
 Faleia
 Fasli
 Fasoula
 Foinikas
 Fyti
 Galataria
 Geroskipou
 Gialia
 Giolou
 Goudi
 Inia
 Istinjon
 Kallepia
 Kannaviou
 Karamoullides
 Kathikas
 Kato Akourdhalia
 Kato Arodes
 Kedares
 Kelokedara
 Kidasi
 Kilinia
 Kinousa
 Kissonerga
 Koili
 Konia
 Kouklia
 Kourtaka
 Kritou Marottou
 Kritou Terra
 Lapithiou
 Lasa
 Lemona
 Lempa
 Letymvou
 Livadi
 Loukrounou
 Lysos
 Makounta
 Mamonia
 Mamountali
 Mandria
 Marathounta
 Maronas
 Meladeia
 Melandra
 Mesa Chorio
 Mesana
 Mesogi
 Milia
 Miliou
 Mousere
 Nata
 Nea Dimmata
 Neo Chorio
 Nikokleia
 Pano Akourdaleia
 Pano Archimandrita
 Pano Arodes
 Pano Panagia
 Paphos
 Pegeia
 Pelathousa
 Pentalia
 Peristerona
 Philousa Kelokedharon
 Philousa Khrysokhous
 Pitargou
 Polemi
 Polis, Cyprus
 Pomos
 Praitori
 Prastio
 Psathi
 Salamiou
 Sarama
 Simou
 Skoulli
 Souskiou
 Statos–Agios Fotios
 Stavrokonnou
 Steni
 Stroumpi
 Tala
 Terra
 Theletra
 Thrinia
 Timi
 Trachypedoula
 Tremithousa
 Trimithousa
 Tsada
 Vretsia
 Zacharia

References

 
Districts of Cyprus